The 2007 Men's Hockey Hamburg Masters was the thirteenth edition of the Hamburg Masters, consisting of a series of test matches. It was held in Hamburg, Germany, from 2–5 August 2007, and featured four of the top nations in men's field hockey.

Competition format
The tournament featured the national teams of Belgium, England, Spain, and the hosts, Germany, competing in a round-robin format, with each team playing each other once. Three points were awarded for a win, one for a draw, and none for a loss.

Officials
The following umpires were appointed by the International Hockey Federation to officiate the tournament:

 Christian Bläsch (GER)
 Colin Hutchinson (IRE)
 Hamish Jamson (ENG)
 Rob ten Cate (NED)
 Juan Requena (ESP)

Results
All times are local (Central European Summer Time).

Pool

Fixtures

Statistics

Final standings

Goalscorers

References

External links
Official website
Deutscher Hockey-Bund

2007
Men's
2007 in Belgian sport
2007 in English sport
2007 in German sport
2007 in Spanish sport
Sport in Hamburg
August 2007 sports events in Europe